The discography of Canadian punk rock band Propagandhi, consists of seven studio albums, three extended plays, four splits, two live albums, three demo tapes, one compilation album and a handful of tracks released on various other compilations.

Studio albums

Extended plays

Splits

Live

Demo tapes

Compilations

Videography

Other appearances
 "Portage La Prairie" from Play at Your Own Risk, Volume 2 (Recess Records, 1994)—credited to Propagandhi but actually just fellow Winnipeg musician (who would later go on to collaborate with then Propagandhi bassist John K. Samson in The Weakerthans) John Sutton singing over a synthesized beat.
 "Nation States" from Survival of the Fattest (Fat Wreck Chords, 1996), a different version of the track found on Less Talk, More Rock
 "The Only Good Fascist is a Dead Fascist (Dallas Hansen Dance Mix)" from Better Read Than Dead (AK Press/Epitaph Records, 1994), the same track from Less Talk, More Rock but with an answering machine message critical of the band played before and after the song
 "Hard Times", a Cro-Mags cover from Return of the Read Menace (AK Press, G7 Welcoming Committee Records, 1998), the first studio-recorded track to feature bassist Todd Kowalski.
 "War is Peace, Slavery is Freedom, May All Your Interventions Be Humanitarian" from Live Fat, Die Young (Fat Wreck Chords, 2001)—an updated version of the song "Fine Day" (available on Where Quantity Is Job #1) with completely new lyrics.

References

Discographies of Canadian artists
Punk rock group discographies